Keluang is a district in the Musi Banyuasin Regency, South Sumatra Province, Sumatra, Indonesia. As of the 2010 census, the population was estimated to be 28,342.

References

Populated places in South Sumatra